Dontostemon is a genus of flowering plants belonging to the family Brassicaceae.

Its native range is Siberia to Temperate Eastern Asia.

Species:

Dontostemon dentatus 
Dontostemon elegans 
Dontostemon glandulosus 
Dontostemon gubanovii 
Dontostemon hispidus 
Dontostemon integrifolius 
Dontostemon intermedius 
Dontostemon micranthus 
Dontostemon perennis 
Dontostemon pinnatifidus 
Dontostemon senilis

References

Brassicaceae
Brassicaceae genera